Sanur (pronounced sah-noor) is a coastal stretch of beach east of Denpasar in southeast Bali (about a 30-minute drive from Ngurah Rai International Airport), which has grown into a little town in its own right. A  area of Sanur's coastline, from Matahari Terbit Beach to Mertasari Beach, was reclaimed in 2008.

History 
In 1906 the northern part of Sanur Beach was used as the landing site for the Dutch invasion troops during the intervention in Bali. During World War II, Sanur was again the entry point through which the Japanese forces landed to occupy the island of Bali.

Tourism 
Bali Beach Hotel in Sanur was built by Indonesian President Sukarno in 1963, and boosted tourism in Bali. Before the construction of the Bali Beach Hotel, only three significant hotels existed on the island. Construction of hotels and restaurants began to spread throughout Bali.

Today Sanur contains a number of hotel resorts such as the Fairmont Sanur Beach Bali and the Hyatt Regency Bali (not to be confused with the Grand Hyatt in Nusa Dua). Sanur is also home to a growing number of popular villa resorts.

Also catering to the tourists are a burgeoning number of restaurants and shops spread around the coastal area. Many of these are Bali-grown brands that favor ingredients or materials original to the island. Among those, The Sandwich Bar, Flamingo Beach Club in Pantai Saba, or Italian Gelateria and restaurant Massimo is a long-standing institution, with queues to be seen on almost every night. Another Italian style in Sanur is resort wear boutique BIASA, a fashion pioneer on the island founded by art enthusiast Susanna Perini. There are plenty of other retail spots along the coastal area, which, in comparison to other destinations on the island, cater more to a mature group of Bali visitors.

Sights 
Traditional fishing boats can be seen on the beach of Sanur offering a scenic view of the island Nusa Penida.

Adrien Jean Le Mayeur de Merpes (1880–1958), a Belgian painter, lived in Sanur from 1932–1958. His house was transformed into a museum, Museum Le Mayeur, where about 80 of his most important paintings are exhibited. Bali Orchid Garden, a park about 3 km north of Sanur, is worth a visit as well.

Another interesting sight can be visited in the south of Sanur in Jalan Danau Poso Street beside Pura Blanjong, a small Hindu temple. A stone column, Belanjong pillar measuring 1.77 metres can be seen under a roof at the end of a small and short blind alley. This is the oldest human-made object on Bali. The column bears inscriptions dating from the 9th century written in Sanskrit and in a very old form of Balinese. Various objects made of stone possibly dating from the same period are exhibited as well.

Education

The Bali International School is located in Sanur.

The Sanur Independence School is located also in Sanur.

Rumah Kecil is a playgroup for children between 1–6 years old.

Gallery

See also
Ayung River

References

External links
 

Populated places in Bali
Tourism in Bali
Denpasar